Maria Grigoryevna Isakova (5 July 1918 – 25 March 2011), nicknamed Cinderella of Vyatka, was a World Champion speed skater. She was born in Vyatka (now Kirov), Russian SFSR, and competed for the Soviet Union.

Isakova started skating at a very young age, spending many hours every day on the ice because she liked skating very much. Her speed prompted people in Vyatka to tell her to enter the Soviet Allround Championships. She hesitated but then relented to participated in the 1936 Soviet Allround Championships, pretending to be aged 17 (she was not allowed to compete at her true age of 15); she finished fifth. She would finally win in 1944 a silver all-round medal at the Soviet Championships; gold medals would follow the next five years. She also won the prestigious Kirov prize five times from 1938 to 1951.

Isakova participated in the World Allround Championships three times, winning gold every time. This made her the first female speed skater to become World Champion three times and, since her titles were consecutive, the first female speed skater to become World Champion in three consecutive years. For her achievements, Isakova was awarded the Order of Lenin.

Medals
An overview of medals won by Isakova at important championships she participated in, listing the years in which she won each:

World records
Over the course of her career, Isakova skated one world record on the old Medeo natural icerink at Alma-Ata:

Personal records
To put these personal records in perspective, the WR column lists the official world records on the dates that Isakova skated her personal records.

References

Notes

Bibliography

 Bijlsma, Hedman with Tom Dekkers; Arie van Erk; Gé du Maine; Hans Niezen; Nol Terwindt and Karel Verbeek. Schaatsseizoen '96-'97: 25e Jaargang 1996-1997, statistische terugblik. Assen, the Netherlands: Stichting Schaatsseizoen, 1997. ISSN 0922-9582.
 Eng, Trond. All Time International Championships, Complete Results: 1889 - 2002. Askim, Norway: WSSSA-Skøytenytt, 2002.
 Teigen, Magne. Komplette Resultater Internasjonale Mesterskap 1889 - 1989: Menn/Kvinner, Senior/Junior, allround/sprint. Veggli, Norway: WSSSA-Skøytenytt, 1989. (Norwegian)

External links
 Maria Isakova. Deutsche Eisschnelllauf Gemeinschaft e.V. (German Skating Association).
 Legends of the Soviet sports (in Russian)
 Results of Championships of Russia and the USSR from SpeedSkating.ru
 Historical World Records. International Skating Union.
 Lars Finsen and Platon Ippolitov.  (2003-10-26). Retrieved on 2007-09-08.

1918 births
2011 deaths
Sportspeople from Kirov, Kirov Oblast
Russian female speed skaters
Soviet female speed skaters
World record setters in speed skating
World Allround Speed Skating Championships medalists
Honoured Masters of Sport of the USSR
Recipients of the Order of Lenin